George Matthew Ormond (15 December 1889 – 25 July 1980) was a Scottish footballer who played as a left back in the Scottish Football League for Rangers and Morton.

He won the Scottish league title in the 1911–12 and 1912–13 seasons with Rangers, and missed only one match for Morton when they finished runners-up in 1916–17, the highest position ever achieved by the Greenock club (they were also fourth and third in the two prior seasons and fourth and third again in the two following seasons, easily the strongest run in their history).

In knockout competitions, Rangers won the Glasgow Cup, then seen as an important trophy, in each of the three seasons Ormond was at Ibrox but he was not selected for any of the finals, with Andrew Richmond, John Robertson and Harry Muir selected on each occasion. However, Ormond did appear in two finals during World War I – the War Fund Shield was played for twice with Morton reaching the final both times, winning against Rangers in 1915 then losing to Celtic three years later. Ormond had left the club a short time before their greatest triumph, the Scottish Cup win (again over his previous employers Rangers) in 1921. He ended his career with a short spell with hometown club Arbroath, then playing outwith the SFL in the Scottish Football Alliance.

In 2018, Ormond's 1911–12 league winner's medal was sold at auction for £7,700.

References

1889 births
1980 deaths
Scottish footballers
Association football central defenders
People from Arbroath
Footballers from Angus, Scotland
Arbroath F.C. players
Greenock Morton F.C. players
Rangers F.C. players
Scottish Football League players
Scottish Football League representative players